John Locke's GAA is a Gaelic Athletic Association club located in Callan, County Kilkenny, Ireland. The club was founded in 1889 and almost exclusively fields teams in hurling.

History
The club was founded in 1889 and is named after poet and Fenian activist John Locke. He was born in Callan in 1847 and was exiled in the United States.

Honours
 Kilkenny Senior Hurling Championship (1): 1957
 Leinster Junior Club Hurling Championship (1): 2010
 Kilkenny Intermediate Hurling Championship (3): 1935, 1993, 1999 
 Kilkenny Junior Hurling Championship (5): 1911, 1952, 1987, 2010, 2017 
 Kilkenny Under-21 Hurling 'B' Championship (1) 2010
 Kilkenny Minor Hurling Championship (2): 1950, 1984,
 Kilkenny Minor Hurling 'B' Championship (2) 1997, 2015
 Kilkenny Minor Hurling 'A' League (1) 1984, 2010
 Kilkenny Minor Hurling 'B' League (7) 1989, 1994, 1995, 1996, 2008, 2013, 2015

Famous Hurlers
 Richard Kelly
 Joe Mansfield
 Paddy Moore
 John Power

External links
 John Locke's GAA website

Gaelic games clubs in County Kilkenny
Hurling clubs in County Kilkenny
Callan, County Kilkenny